Rekówka  is a village in the administrative district of Gmina Ciepielów, within Lipsko County, Masovian Voivodeship, in east-central Poland.

History
Rekówka was a private village, administratively located in the Radom County in the Sandomierz Voivodeship in the Lesser Poland Province of the Kingdom of Poland,

During the German occupation (World War II), on December 6, 1942, German Gendarmerie murdered ten Poles from Rekówka who were suspected of hiding the Jewish refuges. The victims were two men, two women and six children.

References

Villages in Lipsko County